Gardens of the Fox Cities (35 acres) are nonprofit botanical gardens and an arboretum located in Appleton Memorial Park at 1313 Witzke Boulevard, Appleton, Wisconsin. They are open daily from dawn to dusk without charge.

Garden displays and natural areas combine to showcase the seasonal beauty of plants and gardens in Wisconsin.

In May 2006, the Gardens announced a long-term expansion project. The plan would include the addition of, among other things, a rose garden, perennial garden, bird meadow, serenity garden, and outdoor amphitheater.

See also 
 List of botanical gardens and arboretums in Wisconsin

External links
 Gardens of the Fox Cities

Arboreta in Wisconsin
Botanical gardens in Wisconsin
Appleton, Wisconsin
Protected areas of Outagamie County, Wisconsin